Tina Flognman (born 29 June 1981) is a Swedish handball player who plays for the club Viborg HK and  the Sweden women's national handball team.

She participated at the 2008 Summer Olympics in Beijing, where Sweden placed 8th. She competed at the 2009 World Women's Handball Championship, where Sweden placed 13th.

At the 2010 European Women's Handball Championship she reached the final and won a silver medal with the Swedish team. She was part of the Swedish handball team at the 2012 Summer Olympics, where they finished in 11th.

References

1981 births
Living people
People from Värmland
Swedish female handball players
Swedish expatriate sportspeople in France
Olympic handball players of Sweden
Handball players at the 2008 Summer Olympics
Handball players at the 2012 Summer Olympics
21st-century Swedish women